El Porvenir or Porvenir (Spanish: "The Future") may refer to:

Places

Porvenir Municipality, Bolivia
Porvenir, Pando, Bolivia
Porvenir, Chile
Porvenir Volcano, Costa Rica
Porvenir, Texas, United States
El Porvenir Parish, Palanda Canton, Zamora-Chinchipe, Ecuador
El Porvenir, Santa Ana, El Salvador
El Porvenir (Maya site), a Maya civilization archaeological site in Petén Department, Guatemala
El Porvenir, Atlántida, Honduras
El Porvenir, Francisco Morazán, Honduras
El Porvenir, Chiapas, Mexico
El Porvenir, Chihuahua, Mexico
El Porvenir, New Mexico, United States
El Porvenir, Chiriquí, Panama
El Porvenir, Guna Yala, Panama
Porvenir (Norte Chico site), a Norte Chico civilization archaeological site in Peru
El Porvenir District, San Martín, Peru
El Porvenir District, Trujillo, Peru
El Porvenir, Seville, Spain
Porvenir, Uruguay

Other uses
Club El Porvenir, a football club based in Gerli, Greater Buenos Aires, Argentina
Club Porvenir Guaireño, a Paraguayan social club
Porvenir Miraflores, a football club based in Miraflores, Lima, Peru
El Porvenir (newspaper), Monterrey, Mexico
El Porvenir (film), a short documentary film directed by Alfredo Alcántara and Josh Chertoff

See also
Porvenir Massacre, a September 2008 ambush in Bolivia
Villa Porvenir, Canelones Department, Uruguay
Porvenir Massacre (1918), the killing of fifteen men by Texas Rangers in 1918